Tasi Nam or (Tashi Gau actual name) is the largest village of Gauri Sankar (Rural municipality) at Dolakha District, Nepal, population of 700. There are living of few ethnic groups like, Sherpa, Magar, Gurung, Kami, Newar, Thakuri, Tamang. Tashi Nam is main gate way of Rolwaling valley and one of gate way go to Mount Everest. Tasi Nan rich in Ophiocordyceps sinensis national pride hydropower like upper tamakoshi hydropower and Siprin Khola hydropower.

References

http://www.tamakoshihydro.org.np/
https://www.facebook.com/synergy.power.development

Populated places in Dolakha District